Ján Koleník (born 11 November 1979) is a Slovak actor. He won the OTO Award for TV Male Actor for three consecutive years between 2010 and 2012. Koleník joined the Slovak National Theatre in 2004. He achieved fame in the Czech Republic for his role in the historical drama The First Republic.

Selected filmography 
Panelák (television, 2008–2014)
 (television, 2010)
The First Republic (television, 2014–2018)
Oteckovia (television, 2018–)

References

External links

1979 births
People from Banská Bystrica
Living people
Slovak male film actors
Slovak male stage actors
Slovak male television actors
21st-century Slovak male actors